Greensboro Arboretum (17 acres) is an arboretum located in Lindley Park at 401 Ashland Drive, Greensboro, North Carolina. It is open to the public daily without charge.

The arboretum features landscaped grounds with labeled plant collections, annual and perennial flowers, an arbor, gazebo and a lighted fountain, including the following displays and collections:

 Butterfly Garden
 Conifer Collection
 Dwarf Conifer Collection (more than 80 species of small conifers)
 Groundcover Collection
 Holly Garden
 Hosta Collection (approximately 200 hostas) 
 Hydrophytic Collection
 Rhododendron Garden (over 70 varieties)
 Rose Garden
 Shade Shrub Collection
 Small Tree Collection
 Sun Shrub Collection
 Vine Collection & Perennial Border
 Wildflower Trail
 Winter Garden Collection
 Woodland Trail

See also 
 List of botanical gardens in the United States

External links 
 Greensboro Arboretum

Arboreta in North Carolina
Botanical gardens in North Carolina
Protected areas of Guilford County, North Carolina
Geography of Greensboro, North Carolina
Tourist attractions in Greensboro, North Carolina